P. N. Ravindran (born 29 May 1956) was a judge of Kerala High Court. The High Court of Kerala  is the highest court in the Indian state of Kerala and in the Union Territory of Lakshadweep. The High Court of Kerala is headquartered at Ernakulam, Kochi. Justice Ravindran retired from service on 28 May 2018.

He joined Bharatiya Janata Party in March 2021 in presence of Union Finance Minister Nirmala Sitharamanin Kochi.

Career
Ravindran graduated in Law from Government Law College, Ernakulam in the year 1979, enrolled in Bar Council of Kerala on 16 December 1979 and started practicing in Kerala High Court. While practicing in various branches of law, served as Additional Central Government Standing Counsel from 18.06.1998 to 21.04.1999, Legal Advisor and Standing Counsel for Guruvayur Devaswom from 201.11.2002 to 25.04.2005.

He was appointed as the Additional Judge of Kerala High Court on 12 December 2007 and became elevated as Permanent Judge from 9 December 2009.

References

1956 births
Living people
Judges of the Kerala High Court
Malayali people
21st-century Indian judges
21st-century Indian lawyers
20th-century Indian judges
20th-century Indian lawyers
People from Palakkad district